Ann Cummings (born July 20, 1946) is a Vermont businesswoman and Democratic politician.  She has served as mayor of Montpelier and a State Senator.

Biography
Ann E. Cummings was born in Holliston, Massachusetts, on July 20, 1946.  She was educated in Wantagh, New York and Lexington, Kentucky, and graduated from Lexington Catholic High School.  In 1968, Cummings graduated from Cardinal Cushing College with a Bachelor of Arts degree in sociology.  She received a Master of Science in Administration degree from Saint Michael's College in 1989.

After college, Cummings was a VISTA volunteer in the Pittsburgh area.  She has been involved in several business ventures, and has most recently worked as a real estate broker.

Cummings became active in government and politics after settling in Montpelier, including terms on the city and regional planning commissions, and on the Montpelier City Council.  In 1988 she was an unsuccessful candidate for mayor, losing to Arthur J. Goss in a four-way race for the nonpartisan position.  In 1990, Cummings defeated Goss; she served from March 1990 to March 1996, and her time in office was most notable for her efforts to coordinate relief efforts after a 1992 flood inundated most of downtown Montpelier.

In 1994, Cummings was an unsuccessful candidate for the Vermont Senate.  In 1996, Cummings was elected as one of three senators who represent Washington County at-large.  She has been reelected every two years since, and has served since January 1997.  From 2001 to 2003, she was the Senate's majority leader.  Cummings has served on several committees in the State Senate, most notably Finance and Education.  She was chairwoman of the Finance Committee from 2011 to 2013, and the Education Committee from 2015 to 2017.  In 2017 she was again named to chair the Finance Committee.

Family
Cummings is married to Regis E. Cummings; they are the parents of four children, three daughters and a son.

References

Sources

Internet

News

1946 births
Living people
People from Holliston, Massachusetts
People from Montpelier, Vermont
Saint Michael's College alumni
20th-century American politicians
21st-century American politicians
Mayors of Montpelier, Vermont
Democratic Party Vermont state senators
20th-century American women politicians
21st-century American women politicians
Majority leaders of the Vermont Senate